West Virginia Route 23 is a north–south state highway in the northern portion of the U.S. state of West Virginia. The northern terminus of the route is at West Virginia Route 18 in Tyler, Tyler County. The southern terminus is at old U.S. Route 50 in Salem, Harrison County.

Major intersections

References

023
Transportation in Doddridge County, West Virginia
Transportation in Harrison County, West Virginia
Transportation in Tyler County, West Virginia